Anisochaeta gigantea (formerly Spenceriella gigantea or Celeriella gigantea), commonly called the North Auckland worm, is a rare giant annelid of the family Megascolecidae, endemic to New Zealand.

Under both the New Zealand Threat Classification System and IUCN Redlist it is classed a "Data Deficient".

References

External links

 The North Auckland worm discussed in RNZ Critter of the Week, 14 Aug 2020
 Royal Society of New Zealand - Studies on the Earthworm Fauna of New Zealand. III

Megascolecidae
Worms of New Zealand
Animals described in 1906
Endemic fauna of New Zealand
Endemic worms of New Zealand